"You've Got a Friend" is a 1971 song written by American singer-songwriter Carole King. It was first recorded by King and included on her second studio album, Tapestry (1971). Another well-known version is by James Taylor from his album Mud Slide Slim and the Blue Horizon. His was released as a single in 1971, reaching number one on the Billboard Hot 100 and number four on the UK Singles Chart. The two versions were recorded simultaneously in 1971 with shared musicians.

"You've Got a Friend" won Grammy Awards both for Taylor (Best Male Pop Vocal Performance) and King (Song of the Year). Dozens of other artists have recorded the song over the years, including Dusty Springfield, Michael Jackson, Anne Murray, and Donny Hathaway.

History

"You've Got a Friend" was written by Carole King during the January 1971 recording sessions for her own album Tapestry and James Taylor's album Mud Slide Slim and the Blue Horizon. King has stated that "the song was as close to pure inspiration as I've ever experienced.  The song wrote itself.  It was written by something outside myself, through me." According to Taylor, King told him that the song was a response to a line in Taylor's earlier song "Fire and Rain" that "I've seen lonely times when I could not find a friend." King's album was recorded in an overlap with Taylor's, and King, Danny Kortchmar, and Joni Mitchell perform on both. The song is included on both albums; King said in a 1972 interview that she "didn't write it with James or anybody really specifically in mind. But when James heard it he really liked it and wanted to record it".

Taylor's version was released as a single, and reached number 1 on the Billboard Hot 100 and number 4 on the UK Singles Chart.  The James Taylor version also spent one week at the top of the Easy Listening charts. Billboard ranked it as the No. 16 song for 1971.

During the recording process, Taylor also offered to his Apple Records labelmate Mary Hopkin a chance to record the song, which she turned down, a decision she later said she strongly regretted.

James Taylor and Carole King performed "You've Got a Friend" together in 2010 during their Troubadour Reunion Tour. In 2015, Taylor performed an acoustic rendition of the song at Hôtel de Ville, Paris, at the invitation of U.S. Secretary of State John Kerry and Paris mayor Anne Hidalgo in tribute to the victims of the January 2015 Île-de-France attacks. King performed the song at the 2021 Rock and Roll Hall of Fame Induction Ceremony.

Reception
According to author James D. Perone, the song's themes include an expression of "a universal, sisterly/brotherly, agape-type love of one human being for another, regardless of gender." The "reassuring" lyrics have long made the song popular with lonely people needing a boost of self-confidence. The song's messages of friendship having no boundaries and a friend being there when you are in need have universal appeal. For Taylor the lyrics had particular resonance due to the depression he had recovered from shortly before hearing King play the song. The music moves between a major and minor key, which according to music critic Maury Dean gives the song a "sympathetic mood."

In his review of Tapestry, Rolling Stone critic Jon Landau called "You've Got a Friend" Carole King's "most perfect new song." He particularly praised how the melody and lyrics support each other, and the "gorgeous, righteous rock melody" of the ending lyrics.  Mojo considered the song to probably be "the core of Tapestry. Allmusic critic Stewart Mason commented on the "plainspoken intimacy" of King's performance.  Mason finds that the "shyness" of King's voice gives her recording of the song a sincerity that he finds Taylor's to lack.  Mason also praises the "depth and shading" provided by the string instruments on King's recording.

In his review of Mud Slide Slim and the Blue Horizon, Rolling Stone critic Ben Gerson described "You've Got a Friend" as an "affirmative song" but suggested that James Taylor's version was too similar to Carole King's original version to have been worth including on his album. Music critic Maury Dean describes Taylor's performance style for the song as minimalist and folkish and comments on his "star-spangled sincerity."  Cash Box praised the "tasty material and Taylor's stunning interpretation."

Charts

Weekly charts

Year-end charts

Certifications

Personnel

Carole King version
Carole King – piano, vocals
David Campbell – viola
Terry King – cello
Danny "Kootch" Kortchmar – conga
Charles "Charlie" Larkey – string bass
Barry Socher – violin
James Taylor – acoustic guitar

James Taylor version
James Taylor – vocals, acoustic guitar
Joni Mitchell – backing vocals
Danny Kortchmar – acoustic guitar, congas
Leland Sklar – bass guitar
Russ Kunkel – drums, congas, cabasa

Brand New Heavies version

"You've Got a Friend" was covered by British acid jazz and funk group the Brand New Heavies for their fourth album, Shelter (1997), and released as the third single from the album in October 1997. It reached number nine on the UK Singles Chart and number 13 in Scotland in October 1997. The song also peaked within the top 10 in Hungary and was a top 30 hit in Ireland. The group performed the song on the music chart television program Top of the Pops.

Critical reception
Scottish Daily Record felt that here, "[the] London's soul funk band are back on form". A reviewer from Music Week gave it four out of five, declaring it as "a soulful cover", that "should have their usual specialist impact as well as crossover success." An editor, Alan Jones, stated, "Recruiting Siedah Garrett has given the Brand New Heavies a new lease of life." Daisy & Havoc from the RM Dance Update named it "one of the best tracks on the recent BNH album (which either says something about their songwriting or our age), and now it appears with the compulsory remixes."

Track listings
 CD single, UK and Europe (1997)
 "You've Got a Friend" (radio version)	
 "You Are the Universe" (recorded live at The Forum)	
 "Midnight at the Oasis" (recorded live at The Forum)	
 "Sometimes" (recorded live at The Forum)

 CD single, UK and Europe (1997)
 "You've Got a Friend" (radio version) – 3:27
 "You've Got a Friend" (Brooklyn Funk R&B mix) – 4:58
 "You've Got a Friend" (Ballistic Brothers mix) – 5:00
 "You've Got a Friend" (Brooklyn Funk club mix) – 4:54
 "You've Got a Friend" (Tee's club mix) – 6:27
 "You've Got a Friend" (original mix) – 3:48

Charts

Other versions

Dusty Springfield recorded the song in early 1971 during the sessions for her third Atlantic Records album Faithful. Her recording predates that of James Taylor, but it was shelved until 1999 when it was included as a bonus track on the 1999 Deluxe Edition of her first Atlantic album, the critically acclaimed Dusty in Memphis (which contained four Carole King compositions). Faithful went unreleased due to disputes between Springfield and Atlantic, but the sessions were eventually issued as a stand-alone album in 2015.

The song was recorded by Roberta Flack and Donny Hathaway for their 1972 album Roberta Flack & Donny Hathaway and was released as the album's first single. The single was released a year before the album was and coincidentally was released on the same date as James Taylor's single: May 29, 1971. The Flack and Hathaway version reached #29 on the Billboard Hot 100 and #8 on the R&B chart.

Ella Fitzgerald recorded this song live, in London, on her Pablo Records release:  Ella in London.  1974

This song was also recorded by Aretha Franklin on three separate occasions. The first and best-known was on her 1972 live gospel performance Amazing Grace, as part of a medley with "Precious Lord, Take My Hand". In 1995 she covered the song again on Tapestry Revisited: A Tribute To Carole King alongside BeBe & CeCe Winans, and once in 2010 as a duet with Ronald Isley on his album Mr. I

Lynn Anderson covered this song on her 1971 album How Can I Unlove You.

In approximately 1973 or 1974, the song was covered by Cambodian singer Pou Vannary with the lyrics translated into Khmer. Vannary's rendition is featured in the soundtrack to the 2015 documentary film Don't Think I've Forgotten.

"You've Got a Friend" was performed by Celine Dion, Shania Twain, Gloria Estefan, and Carole King at the VH1 Divas Live concert in Beacon Theatre, New York, in 1998. It was released as a single and reached number 74 on the Belgian Flanders Airplay Chart.

In 2005, British pop/rock band McFly's cover of this song charted at number one in the UK Singles Chart. This was released as a double-A side along with the band's song "All About You". This was also the official single for that year's Comic Relief event.

Yo La Tengo covered this song on their album Popular Songs.

The American TV series Glee used this song in a mashup with Alanis Morissette's You Learn for the season six episode "Jagged Little Tapestry", a tribute to both King's album Tapestry and Morisette's Jagged Little Pill. It was performed by Rachel Berry (Lea Michele), Santana Lopez (Naya Rivera), Brittany Pierce (Heather Morris), Tina Cohen-Chang (Jenna Ushkowitz), Quinn Fabray (Dianna Agron), and Kurt Hummel (Chris Colfer) with their almamater high school's glee club.

Sarah Geronimo with Daddy Delfin Geronimo covered the song from her 2013 album, Expressions.

Hip hop boy band Brockhampton, did a live cover of this from their concert film, Live From The Chapel.

References

Songs about friendship
1971 singles
1997 singles
1998 singles
Carole King songs
James Taylor songs
Andy Williams songs
Michael Jackson songs
Donny Hathaway songs
Roberta Flack songs
Celine Dion songs
Barbra Streisand songs
Gloria Estefan songs
Emily Osment songs
Billy Ray Cyrus songs
McFly songs
Trini Lopez songs
The Brand New Heavies songs
Grammy Award for Song of the Year
Grammy Award for Best Male Pop Vocal Performance
Billboard Hot 100 number-one singles
Cashbox number-one singles
Number-one singles in Denmark
Songs written by Carole King
Warner Records singles
Song recordings produced by Lou Adler
Song recordings produced by Peter Asher
1971 songs
A&M Records singles
Ode Records singles
FFRR Records singles